The 13 May 2007 Makhmoor bombing was of suicide attack using a truck bomb that occurred on 13 May 2007, in the northern Iraqi town of Makhmour. At least 50 people were killed and about 70 people were injured.

References

Bomb Blasts Hit Northern Iraq, Al-Qaida Group Claims Capture of US Soldiers Voice of America
30 killed in Iraq suicide bomb attack Yahoo! News
Death toll from truck bomb in Iraq rises to 50 Reuters

2007 murders in Iraq
Suicide car and truck bombings in Iraq
Terrorist incidents in Iraq in 2007
Mass murder in 2007
May 2007 events in Iraq